Korovino may refer to:
Korovino, Moscow, a historical area in Moscow, Russia
Korovino (rural locality), name of several rural localities in Russia